August Geelmuyden Spørck (13 September 1851 – 14 July 1928) was a Norwegian military officer and politician for the Liberal Party. He is best known as the Norwegian Minister of Defence from 1909 to 1910.

Career
He was born in Kristiania. He became a military officer in 1872. Through the rifle associations he became affiliated with the Liberal Party. He was elected to the Parliament of Norway in 1900, representing the constituency of Trondhjem og Levanger. He held the rank of Captain at that time. He served only one term, but had previously served as a deputy representative during the term 1898–1900. On 20 August 1909, he was appointed as the new Minister of Defence in the first cabinet Knudsen. He held this position until 1 February 1910, when the cabinet resigned. In 1914 he was promoted to Major General, and from 1916 to 1919 he was the Inspector-General of the Infantry. He died in July 1928.

Personal life
His granddaughter Mimi Reimers married Olaf D. Thommessen.

References

1851 births
1928 deaths
Military personnel from Oslo
Norwegian Army generals
Members of the Storting

Liberal Party (Norway) politicians
Defence ministers of Norway
Politicians from Trondheim